Anton Suchkow (born 29 May 2002) is a Belarusian professional footballer who plays for Neman Grodno. 

He is a son of former Belarus international footballer Alyaksey Suchkow.

References

External links 
 
 

2002 births
Living people
Belarusian footballers
Association football forwards
FC Neman Grodno players
FC Naftan Novopolotsk players